Huh Yun-jin (born October 8, 2001), is a Korean-American singer-songwriter based in South Korea. She is a member of South Korean girl group Le Sserafim.

Early life and education
Huh Yun-jin was born on October 8, 2001, in Gangnam, Seoul, South Korea but was raised in Niskayuna, New York, United States, going by the English name Jennifer Huh. Huh was a student at Niskayuna High School before transferring to the Applied Music Department of Hanlim Multi Art School on March 4, 2019.

Career

2018: Produce 48

In 2018, Huh participated in the South Korean survival show Produce 48 by Mnet, representing Pledis Entertainment. She was eliminated before the show's finale, ranking 26th.

2021–present: Debut with Le Sserafim and solo activities
On August 24, 2021, it was reported that Huh had signed a contract with Source Music. On March 14, 2022, Source Music announced the launch of a new girl group, Le Sserafim, in collaboration with Hybe Corporation. She was revealed as the sixth and final member on April 9, 2022. The group debuted with the extended play Fearless on May 2, 2022. Huh was credited for writing and composing the B-side track "Blue Flame". On August 9, 2022, Huh released her first single "Raise Y_our Glass" to commemorate the 100th day of her debut with Le Sserafim. Huh wrote three songs for Le Sserafim's second EP, Antifragile: "Impurities", "No Celestial" and "Good Parts (When the Quality Is Bad but I Am)". The EP was released on October 17, 2022.

Huh released her second single "I ≠ Doll" on January 9, 2023. Written by Huh, the rock-influenced track featuring a trap beat describes her life as an idol who is judged solely based on her looks. The title refers to both the words "idol" and "doll". Illustrated by Huh, its accompanying music video depicts her journey as a public figure "navigating the attention and criticism she receives". Regarding the video's main animated character, Huh said "I wanted to make a character who is at heart multi-dimensional appear two-dimensional and flat on purpose. I thought it'd be interesting to portray a subject that is not so simple in a simple manner." Divyansha Dongre of Rolling Stone India called the song "a sharp critique of the complexities of constantly living in the spotlight and the judgment that follows".

On March 14, 2023, Huh released her third self-composed song titled "피어나도록 (love you twice). The Korean title translates to "until it blooms", which is a reference to the Korean name of Le Sserafim's fan club Fearnot. Accompanying the indie pop single is a music video is created by South Korean animator and artist Ramdaram, which follows a fan who is inspired by an idol to take better care of herself and pick up songwriting, before eventually fulfilling her own dream to stand on stage.

Discography

Singles

Composition credits
All song credits are adapted from the Korea Music Copyright Association's database unless stated otherwise.

Filmography

Television show

Notes

References

External links
 

Le Sserafim members
South Korean women singer-songwriters
2001 births
Living people
Produce 48 contestants
South Korean women pop singers
South Korean female idols
Hanlim Multi Art School alumni
Hybe Corporation artists
South Korean expatriates in the United States
American people of South Korean descent